Ogea may refer to:
 Ogea people: A Papuan people from Papua New Guinea
 Ogea language: The language spoken by the Ogea people
 Ogea Levu, a coral island near Fiji
 Ogea Driki, a coral island near Fiji
 Ogea monarch (Mayrornis versicolor), a species of bird endemic to those islands